The North  Carolina State Capitol is the former seat of the legislature of the U.S. state of North Carolina which housed all of the state's government until 1888. The Supreme Court and State Library moved into a separate building in 1888, and the General Assembly moved into the State Legislative Building in 1963. Today, the governor and his immediate staff occupy offices on the first floor of the Capitol.

History
The building was built following the destruction by fire of the first North Carolina State House in 1831, and today houses the offices of the Governor of North Carolina. It is located in the state capital of Raleigh on Union Square at One East Edenton Street. The cornerstone of the Greek Revival building was laid with Masonic honors by the Grand Master of North Carolina Masons Simmons Jones Baker on July 4, 1833. Construction was completed in 1840. It was designed primarily by the architectural firm of Ithiel Town and Alexander Jackson Davis.  Often credited solely to that team, the design of the capitol was actually the result of a sequence of work by William Nichols Sr. and his son William Nichols Jr., Town and Davis, and then David Paton.
The Capitol housed the entire state government until 1888, and the North Carolina General Assembly met in the capitol building until 1961. The Grand Lodge of North Carolina laid a second cornerstone on the centenary of the first on July 4, 1933. The legislature relocated to its current location in the North Carolina State Legislative Building in 1963. The North Carolina Supreme Court has also convened in the building in the past, most recently meeting in the capitol's senate chamber in 2005 while the Supreme Court Building was undergoing renovations. The Governor and the governor's immediate staff has continued to occupy offices in the building. The Capitol remains largely unaltered from its 1840 state. Only three rooms have been significantly altered through remodeling: the two committee rooms in the east and west wings of the second floor, which were divided horizontally to provide space for restrooms, and the office in the east wing of the first floor, part of which had to be cut away to permit space for an elevator to be installed in 1951. The Capitol was declared a National Historic Landmark in 1973 and the building is located in the Capitol Area Historic District.

The first assembly to meet in this building was the 63rd North Carolina General Assembly of 1840–1841 on November 16, 1840.  The last assembly to meet in this building was the 124th North Carolina General Assembly of 1961, which met from February 8 to June 22, 1961.

Following the heated protests for racial equality of 2020, Governor Roy Cooper ordered the removal of the largest Confederate statue on the State Capitol Grounds.

North Carolina legislature buildings
The North Carolina General Assembly may have initially met in Tryon Palace after being vacated by the British in 1776.   The assembly met in various locations until a building dedicated for use by the state government was completed in 1794 in Raleigh.  This building was destroyed by fire in 1831.  The North Carolina State Capitol building was the home to the assembly from 1840 to 1961.

Images of the North Carolina State Capitol building
In the rotunda is a statue of George Washington. The rotunda  statue is a replica of the original statue by Antonio Canova, which was destroyed by a fire in 1831.  A bust of the 29th Governor of North Carolina (18411845), John Motley Morehead, sits inside the capitol.  A statue of George Washington is on the south side of the capitol. On the east side of the capitol sits a statue of the three Presidents of the United States from North Carolina: James Knox Polk of Mecklenburg County, Andrew Jackson of Union County sitting on horse, and Andrew Johnson of Wake County.  The grounds of the capitol also include statues honoring women of the Confederacy, veterans of the Civil War and Viet Nam War.

See also

List of National Historic Landmarks in North Carolina
National Register of Historic Places listings in Wake County, North Carolina
List of state and territorial capitols in the United States

References

External links

North Carolina State Capitol
NC State Capitol Foundation
The North Carolina State Capitol: Pride of the State, a National Park Service Teaching with Historic Places (TwHP) lesson plan

Government buildings on the National Register of Historic Places in North Carolina
Government of North Carolina
State capitols in the United States
Government buildings with domes
National Historic Landmarks in North Carolina
Buildings and structures in Raleigh, North Carolina
Museums in Raleigh, North Carolina
History museums in North Carolina
Tourist attractions in Raleigh, North Carolina
North Carolina State Historic Sites
National Register of Historic Places in Raleigh, North Carolina
Historic district contributing properties in North Carolina
1833 establishments in North Carolina